Reichlange is a village in the commune of Redange, in western Luxembourg.  , the village has a population of 125.

Redange
Villages in Luxembourg